Bolderāja Lutheran Church is a Lutheran church in Riga, the capital of Latvia. It is a parish church of the Evangelical Lutheran Church of Latvia. The building is situated at the address Lielā iela 45. The wooden church was built in 1875.

References

External links 
 
 Bolderāja Evangelical Lutheran Parish  

Churches in Riga
Lutheran churches in Latvia
Churches completed in 1875
19th-century Lutheran churches
19th-century churches in Latvia